Abd al-Karim al-Nahlawi (born 1926) is a Syrian former military officer and head of the September 1961 Syrian coup d'état against Gamal Abdel Nasser which ended the union of Syria and Egypt as the United Arab Republic. ِOn 28 March 1962, Al-Nahlawi attempted to seize power directly for himself in another coup against his former political allies Nazim al-Qudsi, Maarouf al-Dawalibi and Khalid al-Azm. After this failed coup, he briefly held diplomatic posts in Indonesia, Pakistan, Morocco and Turkey, but after the 8th March 1963 Baathist coup d'état, he was expelled from the army and went into exile in Saudi Arabia, where he has lived ever since.

Al-Nahlawi was a lieutenant colonel in the combined Syrian-Egyptian army when he headed a coalition of moderate officers from Damascus in a coup on behalf of Maamun al-Kuzbari, and in collaboration with Haydar al-Kuzbari (who was married to Al-Nahlawi's sister and is the cousin of Maamun al-Kuzbari), and Muwafak 'Asasa. The coup was against Nasser and locally his deputy Abdel Hakim Amer, who was the Egyptian viceroy in Syria. The Syrian officers were to some degree operating at the behest of the Syrian middle and upper class who opposed Nasser's socialist policies and in particular land reform.

References

Notes 

1926 births
Possibly living people
Leaders who took power by coup
People from Damascus
Syrian colonels
Syrian expatriates in Pakistan